Biker Mice from Mars is an American science fiction action animated series created by Rick Ungar. The series premiered in syndication the week of September 19, 1993. It consists of three seasons of 65 episodes, with the final episode airing in syndication the week of February 24, 1996.

The show follows three anthropomorphic mice motorcyclists named Throttle, Modo, and Vinnie who escape a war on their home planet Mars before arriving to defend the Earth from the evil that destroyed their homeland (the Plutarkians) and to one day return to Mars. The mice's signature weapons consist of a cestus and a laser pistol (Throttle), a bionic arm with built-in laser blaster (Modo), and flares (Vinnie). Despite the frequent battles, no blood is shown, and many villains are monsters, aliens, and robots.

Ownership of the series passed to Disney in 2001 when Disney acquired Fox Kids Worldwide, which also includes Marvel Productions. The series is not available on Disney+.

Plot
On the planet Mars, there existed a race of anthropomorphic mice who enjoyed motorsports and had a very similar culture and society to that of human beings. At some point in time they were all but wiped out by the Plutarkians, an alien race of obese, foul-smelling, worm-eating, fish-like humanoids who plunder other planets' natural resources because they have wasted all of their own. Three survivors: Throttle, Modo and Vinnie, manage to find a spaceship and escape the Plutarkian takeover but they are soon shot down by a Plutarkian warship and end up crash-landing on Earth in the city of Chicago, specifically in the scoreboard of Quigley Field. There they meet a charming female mechanic named Charlene "Charley" Davidson and discover that the Plutarkians have come to Earth to steal its natural resources.

The Biker Mice investigate the crumbling ghetto of the windy city and soon discover that Chicago's leading industrialist, Lawrence Limburger, is actually a Plutarkian who disguises himself as a human, plotting to ransack Earth's resources to send to his own dying planet. Limburger enlists two henchmen, mad scientist Dr. Karbunkle and the idiotic Greasepit, to help him steal Earth's natural resources and send them to Plutark with the help of some supervillains that they transport from another location in the galaxy. The Biker Mice dedicate themselves as heroic vigilantes destined to stop Limburger's evil schemes. The most frequent sign of victory is destroying Limburger's tall tower, forcing him to constantly spend money and time to rebuild it by the next episode.

Episodes

Characters

Protagonists

 Throttle (voiced by Rob Paulsen) – The tan-furred leader-figure of the trio with a quiff and ponytail. He is the most logical, level-headed, rational and calculating of the three. Throttle lost his sight in an incident on Mars that also caused the losses of Modo's right arm and the right side of Vinnie's face, and was fitted with malfunctioning bionic eyes while in captivity: as a result, he wears green sunglasses with field spec capabilities, and on his right hand he wears a powered glove which increases the strength of his blows with that fist called Nuke Knucks that was made by Harley. He also carries a holstered laser pistol and sports a leather biker vest, making him the only one of the trio to carry a conventional weapon or wear clothes instead of armor. He rides a black cruiser-type motorcycle, and his first symbolic quote in the series was, "In this wild and woolly universe, there are three things you can count on: your brains, your bros and your bike!"
 Modo (voiced by Dorian Harewood) – The gray-furred gentle giant of the trio who sports an eye patch, suggesting that his eye may have been damaged during Karbunkle's experiments. He lost his right arm in the same incident that burned off the right side of Vinnie's face and caused Throttle to lose his sight, and Karbunkle replaced his arm with a robotic replacement that has a built-in laser cannon and great strength, as part of Stilton’s thwarted plans to create an army of bionic warriors. Modo wears powered shoulder pads in addition to his bionic arm. When angry, his right eye flashes red. He is prone to fits of rage when he or his companions are referred to as 'rats'; his first signature quote actually was "RAT?!! My mama didn't raise no stinkin' rat! UNDERSTAND?!". Modo is by far the strongest of the three mice, but despite outwardly looking the most threatening and aggressive, he is the most empathetic and sensitive of the group, frequently referencing what his gray-furred mama used to say. Modo does not want any harm to befall Charley, and as such, she 'mothers' him in return. His bike, a purple cruiser-type motorcycle, is the only one out of the three with a definite name ("Lil' Hoss"), and the one with the most demonstrated AI capability.
 Vinnie (voiced by Ian Ziering) – The white-furred thrill-seeker and self-proclaimed lady-killer among the trio, a classic example of an egomaniac (with an inferiority complex, especially during his early days as a freedom fighter). The right side of his face was burned off in the same incident where Throttle lost his sight and Modo lost his right arm, thus he wears a flexible face-plate. Vinnie rides a red sport bike in contrast to the others' cruisers, and is the most active of the three, often volunteering for the most dangerous tasks, enjoying the rush and subsequent glory and bragging rights. He wears a green cross-belt on his chest and wields expandable flares that were made by Harley. His bike seems to have the greatest arsenal of weaponry between the three, and he is the best overall biker of the trio. He has a recurring catchphrase, "What a rush!", and has a signature laugh of triumph. Vinnie is definitely the wildest, most fun-loving and egotistical of the group; all three are adrenaline junkies, but even Throttle and Modo cannot understand how he is still alive, considering the risks he takes. Despite his "hyper-masculinity", Vinnie is actually a very loving and caring individual. He flirts endlessly with Charley, who's constantly rebuffs him, but anytime she does reciprocate, Vinnie can only blush in extreme shyness. Vinnie has a near-pathological loathing for cheese, though he, like the rest of the Biker Mice, enjoys eating hot dogs.

Supporting characters
 Charlene "Charley" Davidson (voiced by Leeza Miller-McGee) – The Mice are always backed up by Charley, an auburn haired, green-eyed beautiful girl mechanic, who owns the Last Chance Garage in Chicago. She is a headstrong woman and is always ready to go into battle, though the Biker Mice try to keep her out of dangerous situations, never because they think she is incapable or weak, but because they could not bear anything bad happening to her. Aside from being the target of Vinnie's affection (which she playfully blows off) and being close with Modo, she is also responsible for repairs and upgrades to the Mice's bikes, is a high-tech genius in her own right, and is as skilled a biker as the Mice. Her name is an obvious pun on Harley Davidson.
 Rimfire (voiced by Brian Austin Green) – Modo's nephew who is overprotected by his peers on Mars because of his age, despite the fact that he, too, is clearly capable of what it takes to be a worthy Freedom Fighter. He first appeared in the episode "Back to Mars, Part 2" when the three Mice were escaping prison. He appears again in the episode Stalkers, where he also crashed into the scoreboard at Quigley Field while escaping from intergalactic rogue bounty hunters (who view the Biker Mice as the big championship stock) that eventually request Limburger's permission, and he played a crucial role in their defeat. He also appears in the 3-part episode Once Upon a Time on Mars, where the viewers see for the first time how his age led to distrust from some of his peers.
 General Carbine (voiced by Leah Remini) – General Carbine is the de facto leader of the Freedom Fighters, a former Army officer who defected during the Plutarkian-Mars war. She and Throttle are lovers, but their relationship suffers complications owing to her position among the Freedom Fighters.
 Stoker (voiced by Peter Strauss) – Stoker is the founding father of the Freedom Fighter movement on Mars, and as seen in Once Upon a Time on Mars, revealed that Mars was sold, beginning to have doubts over the fight; eventually he continues fighting as part of the rebellion. He plays a more crucial role in the 2006 revival, where he fights to protect his invention from the invading Catatonian Empire.
 Harley (voiced by Kath Soucie) – A mechanic/nurse among the Freedom Fighters. She was involved in a love triangle between Vinnie and Stoker until Vinnie's injuries moved her enough to make him the face-plate and cross-belts he wears. Hardly had they come to an understanding, she was abducted by Mace towards the end of the Freedom Fighters' insurrection. She returns as an antagonist in the 2006 series.
 Four-By (voiced by Michael Dorn) - Another good guy on the block and a friend to the Biker Mice who drives a monster truck.
 "Asphalt" Jack McCyber (voiced by Jason Priestley) - A computer expert and inventor who is an old friend of Charley whose inventions are always targeted by the Plutarkians.

Antagonists
 Lawrence Lactavius Limburger (voiced by W. Morgan Sheppard) – The main villain of the series and archenemy of the Biker Mice. Lawrence Limburger is a bloated alien from Plutark and has an odd fascination for Earth's criminal society of the 1930s. He is the head of Limburger Industries, the biggest industrial company in Chicago. Wearing a purple business suit and a rubber mask in order to look human at most times, he attempts to mine it and other parts of Earth of various resources including random earth, dirt, rock, snow, metal and oil, which he plans to send back to his own dying planet. He is highly resourceful and cunning, but always failing due to the Biker Mice's interventions. His headquarters is a very tall tower called Limburger Plaza. Unfortunately for him, his plans are foiled and his tower is either destroyed, torn down, launched into space or even disappears completely by the Biker Mice or some other misfortune at the climax of almost every episode. During the War of Liberation on Mars, Limburger was a low-ranked and bullied officer, taunted by both his superior Stilton and Karbunkle. Limburger managed to attain his present rank by using Stilton’s absence during the Biker Mice’s attack on the Plutarkian base to attain his present rank. Limburger reappears in the 2006 sequel series, initially as a bootlicker for the Pit Boss but later as a co-conspirator alongside the Catatonians.
 Dr. Benjamin Boris Zachary Karbunkle (voiced by Susan Silo) – A thin, sly mad scientist of an indeterminate human-shaped species. Karbunkle used to work for Limburger's superior Dominic T. Stilton until Limburger bribed him to cross over. Karbunkle's main task is to think of machines and robots to either battle the Biker Mice, gather resources from Earth, or look up the villain of the week with his dimensional transporter. During the War of Liberation on Mars, he gave Modo his bionic arm and eye, Stoker his bionic tail, and Throttle his malfunctioning bionic eyes as part of his experiments to create a bionic army after they were captured by Plutarkian forces. He intended to use one of his inventions, the Mind Bender Beam, to brainwash them into being loyal to the Plutarkians; he was only able to brainwash Stoker before the Biker Mice escapes, and Stoker was later freed from Plutarkian control, while the Beam was destroyed. Karbunkle is a sycophant, often seen admiring Limburger and praising him; however, Karbunkle's top priority is Karbunkle. He is often seen torturing Fred the Mutant, cares little about his co-worker Greasepit and has traded Plutarkian employers many times. Karbunkle is very sadistic and is known to enjoy torturing people, wears a white lab coat, high heeled boots, has a green pair of goggles which he never takes off and once in a while, his red underwear is revealed. Also reappears in the 2006 series as well and suffers the same fate as Limburger. 
 Greasepit (voiced by Brad Garrett) – The stereotypical cartoonish bungling bad guy sidekick usually in charge of whatever project Lawrence Limburger is running at the time. He fails in his endeavors most of the time, which Limburger soon learns to factor into his planning. Greasepit rides a motorized tricycle into battle against the Biker Mice at the head of his goons and wears a pair of gardening trousers like a mechanic's. As his name suggests, Greasepit constantly oozes oil and he is consistently clumsy, often falling over or dropping critical pieces of Limburger's schemes. Greasepit is the first villain Limburger ever hired though, his advert was "spiced up" to make him seem more capable than the bungling goof he is by his agent (who is possible also his mother). Briefly reappeared in the 2006 series as a henchman for new series villain Ronaldo Rump during the end of the story arc.
 Fred the Mutant (voiced by Rob Paulsen) – Fred is a masochistic mutant working for Limburger. He thrills at the thought of receiving pain and that is his one purpose as well, being the subject of many of Karbunkle's testings as well as physical abuse by Limburger. He was created back on Mars when Limburger bribes Karbunkle to create a supervillain for him; the procedure somehow went wrong, creating Fred instead. He is a midget with clothing similar to portrayals of Quasimodo, is bald and has three pink eyes with black irises, a bushy tail, duck-like feet, and a tentacle instead of a right arm.
 Napoleon Brie (voiced by Luke Perry) – Limburger's unhinged chief Plutarkian rival from Detroit who is far more successful than Limburger in his efforts. He dominates Detroit. Despite this, Brie's attempts at taking out the Biker Mice turn out just as futile as Limburger's. Brie's efforts are not helped by his undermining Limburger at the same time. Small of stature and the owner of a large variety of facial masks although he only ever wears the one with a crazy eye and speaks with an accent very similar to Elmer Fudd.
 Number One (voiced by Mark Hamill in the first appearance, Jeff Bennett in later appearances) - A gun for hire with a big red beard and sunglasses who works for Napoleon Brie.
 Plutarkians – The Plutarkians are a race of fish-like aliens that either plan to obtain Earth's resources or conquer Earth. Each of them is named after a cheese. Besides Limburger and Brie, the Plutarkians consist of:
 Lord Camembert (voiced by Jeff Bennett) – Limburger's higher-up. Limburger finds disgusting especially when he makes him do the embarrassing Plutarkian greeting. In some other cases, he will appear with the entire Plutarkian council with Limburger in a panic over what task is current. He often appears on the vidcom or in person to Limburger and berates him for his failure, often at a loud yelling voice. As High Chairman of Plutark, Camembert holds highest power of the planet for four-year term at once.
 Mudfish Murdock (voiced by Jeff Bennett) – A Plutarkian trucker who was hired by Limburger to kill the Biker Mice while he attempted to drain Lake Michigan and deliver it to Plutark.
 Provolone (voiced by Jeff Bennett) – A Plutarkian lawyer.
 Dominic T. Stilton (voiced by Malcolm McDowell) - A Plutarkian who was Limburger and Karbunkle's superior on Mars prior to the events of the series. Stilton hates Limburger for his scheming and repeated attempts to usurp him. Unlike other Plutarkians, Stilton is a neat freak who constantly carries around handkerchiefs to wipe dirt and grime off of himself and anything he touches. Stilton's plans to destroy the Martian resistance were thwarted by the Biker Mice, and Limburger took advantage of the situation to become an equally-ranked Plutarkian officer, effectively not having to take orders from Stilton anymore.
 Gerald Guyere (voiced by Jim Cummings) - A Plutarkian operating in New Orleans.
 Jack Monteray (voiced by Jeff Bennett) - A Plutarkian operating in Las Vegas. He is often nicknamed "One-Eyed Jack".
 Gutama Gouda (voiced by Jim Cummings) - A Plutarkian operating in Los Angeles.
 Romana Parmesana (voiced by Tori Spelling in normal form, Jennie Garth as Angel Revson) - A Plutarkian operating in Cleveland. She used her disguise of Angel Revson to manipulate Jack McCyber in her plot to usurp Lawrence Limburger and Napoleon Brie.
 Pit Boss (voiced by Stu Rosen) – The Pit Boss is the burly ruler of the Pits outside of town. The Pit Boss has an electric whip that he uses to keep his slaves in line.
 Pit Crew – The henchmen of Pit Boss who will come up and rob various places, often taken hostages as well.
 Road Ravens - A gang that was once used by Limburger to steal gasoline from different trucks.
 Jimmy Mac (voiced by Jerry Houser) - The leader of the Road Ravens.
 Stalkers (voiced by Robert Ito and Brad Garrett respectively) - A group of alien bounty hunters.
 Mace (voiced by Jeff Bennett) – Mace is a Nomad Rat who appears to be disguised as a mouse and into intervening with the mice and the Plutarkian war in secret and sometimes coming into conflict with Vinnie, but he escaped by grabbing Harley and teleporting to the Nomad Rat base.

Supervillains
In most episodes, Limburger orders Karbunkle to use the transporter to bring into Chicago one of the very powerful supervillains in the universe. Generally each of them have one special ability which is useful for Limburger's plan in hand. Most of them seem to use an asteroid station called Black Rock as their main hideout when they are not summoned by those willing to pay for their services. On one notable occasion in the episode "A Scent, a Memory, a Far Distant Cheese", Limburger and Karbunkle accidentally got sucked into the transporter and appear at the Black Rock where all the villains up to that episode confront him for not paying them as they asked for. The episode "Diet of Worms" shows that the other Plutarkians can use the same supervillains.

The following supervillains are listed in order of appearance:

 X-Terminator – A robotic bounty hunter that rides a customized combat motorcycle. He was the first supervillain that Limburger summoned to destroy the Biker Mice. In the episode "Diet of Worms", X-Terminator was paired up with Jack Monteray.
 Lectromag (voiced by Mark Hamill) – An electromagnetic supervillain who the Biker Mice often have a hard time defeating.
 Tunnel Rat (voiced by Rob Paulsen) – A rat-like villain who is an expert at driving any digging vehicle.
 The Loogie Brothers (voiced by Neil Ross and Jess Harnell) – Hacka and Honka Loogie are known as the "Scum of the Universe." They were summoned by Limburger to stink up Chicago, summoned to collaborate with Evil Eye Weevil in a motocross plot, and later summoned to take advantage of Chicago's garbage crisis.
 Evil Eye Weevil (voiced by Jess Harnell impersonating Elvis Presley) – An egotistical Martian villain and former stunt performer who can induce hostility in anyone. Limburger summoned him to break the Biker Mice apart. He claims to be Elvis Presley's alien brother and dresses like and has similar mannerisms to Presley. Evil Eye Weevil later collaborated with the Loogie Brothers in Limburger's motocross plot.
 Pukes of Hazard (voiced by Jeff Bennett and Rob Paulsen) – The aides of Evil Eye Weevil.
 Corroder Cody (voiced by Charlie Adler) – An eyepatch-wearing human-shaped villain who was hired by Limburger to purloin the oil refineries.
 Munsterella and Gorgonzola (voiced by Elinor Donahue and Eddie Barth) – A towering reptilian humanoid duo.
 Weathermeister (voiced by Russi Taylor) – A female villain and old friend of Karbunkle. She can control the weather by placing her weather stickers on a map.
 Pulverizer (voiced by Jeff Bennett) – A cyborg. He assisted Limburger into stealing a military weapon called the Annihilator.
 Stone Cutter (voiced by CCH Pounder) – A female jackhammer-wielding supervillain. Limburger enlisted her to help steal Mount Rushmore.
 Jet Blaster (voiced by Jeff Bennett) – A robotic villain with no legs who can fly unusual devices. He was hired by Limburger to cut Chicago from Earth so that he can send it to Plutark.
 Catscan (voiced by Jeff Bennett) – A cat-like villain with psychic powers that was used by Limburger in a plot to get the Last Chance garage condemned.
 Slobber the Mutt (voiced by W. Morgan Sheppard) - The leader of the hyena-like Sand Raiders on Mars.
 Billie Monnie (voiced by Susan Silo) – A bird-like bounty hunter. She was originally after Limburger for an unknown client until Limburger paid her to target the Biker Mice.
 Mechanic – A mute cyborg who can control any mechanical devices. He once infected the motorcycles of the Biker Mice. In the episode "Diet of Worms", Mechanic was paired up with Gerard Gruyere.
 Cycletaurs - Creatures created by Karbunkle that are the result of him combining the DNA of the Biker Mice with the molecular structure of three motorcycles. In the episode "Diet of Worms", a Cycletaur was paired up with Gutama Gouda.
 Icebreaker (voiced by David Warner) – A supervillain who has powers over cold and heat. He assisted Limburger in a plot to retrieve a satellite module that ended up in the North Pole due to interference from the Biker Mice. Modo defeated Icebreaker by deflecting his ice beam back at him with his bionic arm.

Broadcast
The series has been aired from 1993 to 1996 in the United States on many first-run syndicated affiliates.

The series has been aired on the YTV/Fox Kids (English) and Le Canal Famille (French) channels in Canada.

In the United Kingdom from 1994 to 1997, the series was aired on Channel 4 and from 1998–99 on its youth strand T4. CITV on ITV2 re-ran the series at 07.55 Monday to Friday for a 10-week strip from early September 2006. It was repeated on ITV2 at 08.25 Monday to Friday for 10 weeks from March 27, 2007.

The cartoon was broadcast in the Republic of Ireland on RTÉ Two on weekday afternoons from 11 September 1995 to 1996.

United Kingdom/US 
 Channel 4 / T4 / The Big Breakfast (1994–1999) 
 CITV on ITV2 (2006–2007) 
 Nickelodeon (1995–1998)
 Fox Kids (1999) (US)

2006 revival

The Biker Mice from Mars returned to television in 2006. The 2006 Biker Mice from Mars series is a continuation of the story, while giving more airtime to another character, General Stoker.

The new 28-episode series began airing in the United Kingdom on Toonattik on GMTV on August 26, 2006.  However, due to production problems at the studio in the Philippines the series was not finalized until late 2007, resulting in the launch in the United States and many other countries being delayed until 2008 as it still needed to be dubbed.

The series was largely influenced by the major toy line that was manufactured by Italian giant Giochi Preziosi in 2005. GP retained Pangea as developers of the toy line, working in tandem with creator and executive producer, Rick Ungar. Characters, vehicles, and weapons used in the series were first developed by Pangea and turned over to G7 Animation for integration into the series. The team of Ungar, G7, and Pangea collaborated in order to maintain consistency between the intellectual property and the execution of the primary toy range, as the GP licensing monies were utilized to set in motion the series development.

Other media

Video games
An LCD game of same name was released for Tiger Electronic Game on 1993.

A Biker Mice from Mars video game was released by Konami for the Super NES in 1994. The PAL version features extensive advertisements for Snickers candy bars. A Biker Mice from Mars game was also planned for Sega Mega Drive but it was never released.

In 2006, another Biker Mice from Mars video game was released based on the 2006 revival in Finland, Australia and the United Kingdom for the Nintendo DS and PlayStation 2 platforms. The game did not receive any major positive ratings although it was a major sales success throughout Scandinavia.

In 2015, a Biker Mice from Mars mobile game was released by 9thImpact for iOS and Android devices through the App Store and Google Play Store.  The game is divided into episodes, each with a different storyline which unfolds as the player completes the levels. Commenting on the new game, series creator Rick Ungar said that Biker Mice fans would enjoy the snappy banter, classic catchphrases and irreverent satire that they would expect from the series, in addition to the non-stop action.

Comic books
Marvel Comics published a three-issue series in the early 1990s. A fourth issue was solicited on the reader's page.
Marvel UK published its own series. The whole American series and portions of the British series were published in Germany (also by Marvel UK) in 7 magazine-sized issues from 1994 to 1995.

See also

 List of anthropomorphic animal superheroes
 Avenger Penguins (UK Counterpart)
 Extreme Dinosaurs
 Wild West C.O.W.-Boys of Moo Mesa
 Road Rovers
 Street Sharks
 SWAT Kats: The Radical Squadron
 Teenage Mutant Ninja Turtles
 Bucky O'Hare

References

External links

 Biker Mice from Mars at Don Markstein's Toonopedia. Archived from the original on August 27, 2015.
 
 Biker Mice From Mars (2015 video game) on Google Play Store
 Biker Mice From Mars (2015 video game) on App Store

 
1990s American animated television series
1990s toys
1993 American television series debuts
1996 American television series endings
American children's animated action television series
American children's animated adventure television series
American children's animated science fiction television series
American children's animated superhero television series
Animated television series about mice and rats
Chicago in fiction
English-language television shows
Extraterrestrial superheroes
Fictional vigilantes
First-run syndicated television programs in the United States
Fictional motorcycle clubs
Mars in television
Motorcycle television series
Television series by Disney–ABC Domestic Television
Television series by Marvel Productions
Television series by Saban Entertainment
Television series created by Rick Ungar
Television shows adapted into comics
Television shows set in Chicago